Mazar Hoseyni (also Romanized as Mazār Ḩoseynī) is a village in Delvar Rural District, Delvar District, Tangestan County, Bushehr Province, Iran. At the 2006 census, its population was 311, in 70 families.

References 

Populated places in Tangestan County